Csaba Ferencz (born May 24, 1985) is a Hungarian basketball player for BC Körmend and the Hungarian national team.

He participated at the EuroBasket 2017.

References

BC Körmend players
Hungarian men's basketball players
People from Körmend
Shooting guards
1985 births
Living people
Sportspeople from Vas County